Shir Shoshani (born January 26, 1979) is deputy school director, head of the film and television department at the Jerusalem Sam Spiegel Film and Television School, a film lecturer and first AD in the Israeli film industry.

Biography 
Born in Ramat HaSharon in 1979, her father, Dr. Shimshon Shoshani was the CEO of the Ministry of Education in Israel, the Jewish Agency and "Taglit- Birthright Israel". Her mother, Dr. Yael Shoshani is a psychologist and served as the head of the psychological association.

Shoshani lives in Tel Aviv with her son.

Early life and education 
Shoshani is a graduate of Alon High School, Ramat Hasharon. Her student film “Remodeling” (1996), starring Dan Muggia won the Van Leer Award at the Jerusalem Film Festival. Shoshani was a Member of the C.I.S.V charitable, independent, non-political, volunteer organization which promotes peace education and cross cultural friendship.

Shoshani served in the IDF and won a citation for excellence.

She completed her studies at the Jerusalem Sam Spiegel Film and Television School in 2008 where she won the America-Israel Cultural Foundation Award for her film “Under Water” and the David Shapira award for student excellence.

Career 
Shoshani served as executive producer at LiberMedia from 1999 to 2000 and then as the executive producer for promos at Keshet Media Group (2000–2003) working under Muli Segev and Shai Avivi.

Between 2006 and 2016 Shoshani worked as first AD on numerous Israeli and international Film and TV Productions, including the Golden Lion winner "Lebanon” (Samuel Maoz ,2009); Cannes Film Festival best screenplay winner “Footnote (film)” (Joseph Cedar ,2011); and Natalie Portman’s directorial debut “A Tale of Love and Darkness (film) (2015). Shoshani had leading Main roles also on the Sony International series “Absentia (TV series)" (2019) and Netflix’s “[1]Hit and Run” (2020).

Over the years Shoshani has been a mentor to tens of student films and served in 2015 as the head of the producers’ track at the Jerusalem Sam Spiegel Film and Television School. Shoshani taught professional set production at the Steve Tisch Department of Film at Tel Aviv University (2018–2021).

In June 2021 she was appointed Deputy School Director, Head of the film and television department at the Jerusalem Sam Spiegel Film and Television School.

Filmography

External links 
 
 Shir Shoshani on BFI

Living people
1979 births